Brian Paul Boyle (born December 18, 1984) is an American professional ice hockey center who is currently a free agent. Boyle has previously played for the Los Angeles Kings, New York Rangers, Tampa Bay Lightning, Toronto Maple Leafs, New Jersey Devils, Nashville Predators, Florida Panthers and Pittsburgh Penguins of the National Hockey League (NHL).. He attended St. Sebastian's School in Needham, Massachusetts, before moving on to Boston College. Boyle grew up in Hingham, just south of Boston.

Playing career

Los Angeles Kings
Boyle was drafted in the first round, 26th overall, by the Los Angeles Kings in the 2003 NHL Entry Draft. He played four seasons at Boston College before making his professional debut with the Kings' American Hockey League (AHL) affiliate, the Manchester Monarchs, in 2007.

In the 2007–08 season, Boyle made his NHL debut with the Kings against the New Jersey Devils on February 2, 2008. He scored his first career NHL goal that same night against Martin Brodeur in a 6–3 defeat. He scored four goals in his first seven NHL games, three in his first four.

New York Rangers

At the 2009 NHL Entry Draft, on June 27, Boyle was traded to the New York Rangers in exchange for a third-round pick in 2010 (used to select Jordan Weal).

During the 2012 Stanley Cup playoffs, Boyle suffered a concussion after being hit by Ottawa Senators' forward Chris Neil. Boyle subsequently missed three games. Earlier in the same series, Ottawa defenseman Matt Carkner received a one-game suspension for repeatedly punching Boyle in the face. The attack came in response to an unprovoked incident in Game 1 of the series in which Boyle punched Senators defenseman Erik Karlsson in the face.

Tampa Bay Lightning
On July 1, 2014, Boyle left the Rangers after five seasons and signed a three-year, $6 million contract as a free agent with the Tampa Bay Lightning. He changed his sweater number from number 22, which he wore with both the Kings and Rangers, to number 11 out of respect to his best friend and former college hockey player who died that summer. On December 12, 2015, Boyle skated in his 500th career NHL game in a 1–2 Lightning loss to the visiting Washington Capitals. On May 24, 2016, Boyle recorded his first career two goal game in the playoffs. On May 26, Boyle played in his 100th career Stanley Cup playoff game.

Toronto Maple Leafs

Burdened by imminent salary cap space issues and sitting outside of a playoff spot, the Lightning traded Boyle two days before the NHL trade deadline on February 27, 2017, to the Toronto Maple Leafs in exchange for forward Byron Froese and a conditional 2017 second-round draft pick. Boyle, who was on pace for his best season offensively with Tampa Bay, was in the final season of his three-year contract.

Boyle's size, penalty killing abilities and faceoff skills were all major factors in leading the Maple Leafs to target the center. Boyle's playoff experience was also highly coveted (he had played the most playoff games of any player since 2011) by the team made up by a plethora of inexperienced rookies on the cusp of making the post-season. He switched to number 24 in Toronto as number 11 (which he wore in Tampa Bay) was taken by Zach Hyman. Boyle was slotted on the fourth line primarily centreing Matt Martin and Nikita Soshnikov (with Kasperi Kapanen filling in following a late season injury by Soshnikov). Boyle's offensive production declined as a result of the decreased ice time, but his faceoff abilities allowed the team to qualify for the playoffs for the first time in four years. He tallied two assists in the series against the top seeded Washington Capitals as the Maple Leafs fell in six games.

New Jersey Devils
As an unrestricted free agent, on July 1, 2017, Boyle signed a two-year, $5.1 million contract with New Jersey Devils. On November 1, 2017, Boyle played in his first game since his diagnosis of chronic myelogenous leukemia, also his first game with the Devils, against the Vancouver Canucks just over a week after returning to practice. On November 9, he scored his first goal as a member of the Devils, as well as his first goal since his cancer diagnosis, against Cam Talbot of the Edmonton Oilers. "I've never cried after a goal before," Boyle told MSG during a first-intermission interview. "That's a great feeling. It's everything." On January 25, 2018, it was announced Boyle would replace Taylor Hall for the All-Star Game, the latter who suffered a hand injury. During the All-Star Skills Competition on January 27, Boyle finished second in the Accuracy Shooting challenge. At the end of the 2017–18 season, Boyle was selected as the Devils' nomination for the Bill Masterton Memorial Trophy. On April 16, Boyle engaged in a fight with Tampa Bay defenseman Mikhail Sergachev. After both players were restrained, Boyle made threatening comments towards Sergachev, saying, "I'm gonna kill you." On April 21, Boyle was declared as the finalist for the Bill Masterton Memorial Trophy, which he subsequently won on June 20.

The following year, Boyle returned to the Devils and played in his 700th NHL game on October 25. On November 5, Hockey Fights Cancer night, he recorded his first career NHL hat trick in a 5–1 win over the Pittsburgh Penguins.

Nashville Predators
On February 6, 2019, Boyle was traded to the Nashville Predators in exchange for a 2019 second-round pick.

Florida Panthers
As a free agent at the conclusion of his contract with the Predators and despite NHL interest, Boyle went unsigned over the summer. Remaining a free agent leading into the 2019–20 season, Boyle signed a one-year, $940,000 contract with the Florida Panthers on October 21, 2019.

Pittsburgh Penguins
After not playing in the 2020–21 season, Boyle was signed to a professional tryout contract (PTO) by the Pittsburgh Penguins on September 3, 2021. On October 12, 2021, it was announced that Boyle's tryout was successful, and he had signed a one-year, $750,000 contract with the Penguins.  That same day, he appeared in his first NHL game since August 7, 2020, scoring a goal in a 6-2 victory against one of his former teams, the Tampa Bay Lightning.

Personal life
Boyle's younger brother Timothy was drafted in the fourth round of the 2012 NHL Entry Draft by the Ottawa Senators.

Boyle married Lauren Bedford in 2014. The couple has a son and a daughter.

On September 19, 2017, Boyle released a statement announcing he had been diagnosed with chronic myelogenous leukemia, a form of blood and bone marrow cancer  treatable by medication, adding that was the cause of his absence over the summer of training camp. On October 24, 2018, Boyle announced that his leukemia was in full molecular remission but he would remain on medication.

Career statistics

Regular season and playoffs

International

Awards and honors

References

External links
 

1984 births
American men's ice hockey centers
Bill Masterton Memorial Trophy winners
Boston College Eagles men's ice hockey players
Florida Panthers players
Ice hockey players from Massachusetts
Living people
Los Angeles Kings draft picks
Los Angeles Kings players
Manchester Monarchs (AHL) players
Nashville Predators players
National Hockey League All-Stars
National Hockey League first-round draft picks
New Jersey Devils players
New York Rangers players
People from Hingham, Massachusetts
Pittsburgh Penguins players
Sportspeople from Plymouth County, Massachusetts
Tampa Bay Lightning players
Toronto Maple Leafs players
AHCA Division I men's ice hockey All-Americans